Newhaven railway station may refer to either of the following stations in East Sussex, England:

Newhaven Harbour railway station 
Newhaven Marine railway station
Newhaven Town railway station